Ageratina shastensis is a species of snakeroot which is endemic to Shasta County, California. It is known by the common names Mt. Shasta snakeroot and Shasta eupatorium.

Description
Ageratina shastensis is a woody perennial which bears unassuming fluffy white flowers about a centimeter wide. It is an uncommon plant which grows in the cracks of limestone cliffs of the Mount Shasta, part of the Cascade Range.

Etymology
Ageratina is derived from Greek meaning 'un-aging', in reference to the flowers keeping their color for a long time. This name was used by Dioscorides for a number of different plants.

References

External links
Rare California Native Plants Profile: Ageratina shastensis

shastensis
Endemic flora of California
Natural history of Shasta County, California
Plants described in 1979